eDreams Mitja Marató de Barcelona or Barcelona Half Marathon is an annual half marathon arranged in Barcelona, Catalonia, Spain. Organised by RPM Sports and ASO, it is held in February and in 2023 attracted 21,477 runners, with 33% of the registered participants coming from abroad representing 101 nationalities. The half marathon is categorized by World Athletics as a Gold Label road race since 2018.

Over the course of its history, two world records have been set at the Barcelona Half Marathon. In 2014, Kenya's Florence Kiplagat broke the world record for the women's half marathon in a time of 1:05:12. She beat by 38 seconds the previous mark of compatriot Mary Jepkosgei Keitany, set at the Ras Al Khaimah Half Marathon in 2011. A year later, Kiplagat lowered her world record with a time of 1:05.09.

Course
STARTING LINE: Pg. Pujades → P. Picasso → Av. Marqués Argentera → P. Isabel II → P. Colon → Josep Carné → Pl. Drassanes → Paral.lel → Entença → Gran Via → Bailén → Ronda Sant Pere → P. Sant Joan → P. Lluís Companys → B. Muñoz → Pallars → Llacuna → Perú → Josep Pla → Gran Via → Rambla Prim → Diagonal towards Llobregat → Espronceda → Diagonal towards Besós → Plaça llevant → P. Taulat → Selva de Mar → P. Garcia Faria → P. Calvell → Av. Litoral → Port Olímpic → Arquitecte Sert → Salvador Espriu → Marina → Pujades. FINISH LINE: Pg. Pujades

List of winners

Wins by country

References

External links

All results taken from ARRS and World Athletics database.

Half marathons